Argus is the Latinized form of the Ancient Greek word Argos. It may refer to:

Greek mythology

 See Argus (Greek myth) for mythological characters named Argus
Argus (king of Argos), son of Zeus (or Phoroneus) and Niobe
Argus (son of Arestor), builder of the ship Argo in the tale of the Argonauts
Argus Panoptes (Argus "All-Eyes"), a giant with a hundred eyes
Argus, the eldest son of Phrixus and Chalciope
Argus, the son of Phineus and Danaë, in a variant of the myth
Argus or Argos (dog), belonging to Odysseus
Argus or Argeus (king of Argos), son of Megapenthes
Argus, one of Actaeon's dogs
Argus, a watchful guardian

Arts and entertainment

Fictional entities
Argus (comics), in the DC Comics Universe
Argus (Mortal Kombat), a deity
ARGUS (Splinter Cell), a military contractor
A.R.G.U.S., a government agency in the DC Universe
Argus Filch, in the Harry Potter series
Argus, a planet in the Warcraft franchise
Argus, a hero in Mobile Legends: Bang Bang
Argus, in the video game Shadow of the Colossus
KNRB-0 Argus, a weapons platform in the game Vanquish
The Manhattan Argus, a newspaper in the film The Hudsucker Proxy

Games
Argus (video game), a 1986 game by NMK 
Argus no Senshi, the original Japanese title for the arcade game Rygar

Music
Argus (album), a 1972 album by Wishbone Ash
"The Argus", a song by Ween from the album Quebec

Television
"Argus" (30 Rock), a 2010 episode
Argus (TV series), a Norwegian TV debate series that aired between 1993 and 1994

Businesses

Argus (camera company), a camera manufacturer
Argus Brewery, a brewing company located in Chicago, Illinois
Argus Corporation, a Canadian holding company
Argus Media, a business information company
Argos (retailer), a British catalogue retailer

Places

Iran
Argus, Iran, a village in Kerman Province

Spain
Argos (river), a river in the region of Murcia

United States
Argus, California, an unincorporated community
Argus, Pennsylvania, an unincorporated community
Argus Range, a mountain range in Inyo County, California

Publishing
See The Argus (disambiguation) for publications named "The Argus"

United Kingdom
The Argus (Brighton), a newspaper serving Brighton and Hove, England; a member of the Newsquest Media Group
South Wales Argus, published in Newport, South Wales; a member of the Newsquest Media Group
Argus Press, a British publishing company
Telegraph and Argus, a newspaper serving Bradford and surrounding areas.

United States
Barre Montpelier Times Argus, a daily morning newspaper serving the capital region of Vermont
Carlsbad Current-Argus, a New Mexico newspaper
Livingston County Daily Press & Argus, a newspaper that covers Livingston County, Michigan
The Dispatch / The Rock Island Argus, American newspaper that covers the Quad Cities in Illinois and Iowa
Argus Leader, American newspaper that covers Sioux Falls, South Dakota
Argus, a newspaper in Albany, New York, which long functioned as the organ of the Albany Regency
Argus, Midwood High School's school newspaper

Elsewhere
The Argus (Dundalk), a newspaper serving Dundalk, Ireland; a member of the Independent News & Media group also known as Independent.ie
The Argus (Melbourne), former Australian newspaper of record, established in 1846 and closed in 1957
Cape Argus, a newspaper printed in Cape Town, South Africa
Weekend Argus, a newspaper in South Africa, owned by Independent News & Media
Goondiwindi Argus, a newspaper in Goondiwindi, Queensland, Australia, owned by Fairfax Media

Sport
Argus finals system, used in Australian rules football in the early 20th century
Cape Argus Cycle Race in South Africa, colloquially referred to as "The Argus"

Science and technology

Biology
Argus (bird), pheasants from the genera Argusianus and Rheinartia
Argus butterflies, including:
Nymphalidae, e.g., Erebia, Junonia
Polyommatinae (Lycaenidae), e.g., as Aricia, Plebeius, Polyommatus
Theclinae (Lycaenidae): the invalid genus Argus (described by Gerhard, 1850), now in Satyrium
Argus monitor (Varanus panoptes), a species of lizard
Scatophagus argus, a species of fish of the family Scatophagidae
Terebra argus, a mollusk of the family Terebridae

Electronics and computing
Argus (monitoring software), a network and systems monitoring application
Argus (programming language), an extension of the CLU language
Argus - Audit Record Generation and Utilization System, a network auditing system
Argus retinal prosthesis, a bionic eye implant manufactured by Second Sight
Ferranti Argus, a line of industrial control computers
ARGUS-IS, a surveillance system produced by BAE Systems
 Honeywell ARGUS, a low-level computer programming language
Oracle Argus Safety, a pharmacovigilance system from Oracle Health Sciences

Other uses in science and technology

Argus (camera company), a brand of camera
Argus Coastal Monitoring, a video system for observing coastal processes and related phenomena
ARGUS distribution, a probability distribution used in particle physics
Argus Motoren, a German aircraft engine manufacturing firm
ARGUS reactor, a nuclear reactor at the Russian Kurchatov Institute
Operation Argus, a 1958 US military effort to create orbital electron belts using atomic bombs
 ARGUS (experiment), a particle physics experiment at DESY

Vehicles

Types
Argus (automobile), a German automobile manufactured between 1901 and 1909
Fairchild Argus, a British version of the C-61 Forwarder transport aircraft

Named vessels
CP-107 Argus, a Royal Canadian Air Force maritime patrol aircraft
French brig Argus (1800), a French naval ship that took part in the Battle of Trafalgar
HMS Argus, the name of many ships in the British Royal Navy
RFA Argus (A135), a 1981 Primary Casualty Receiving Ship in Britain's Royal Fleet Auxiliary
USS Argus, various ships of the United States Navy
SS Argus, a steel-hulled ship lost in the Great Lakes Storm of 1913

See also
The Argus (disambiguation), the name of several newspapers
Argos (disambiguation)